William Chisholm may refer to:
William Chisholm (I) (died 1564), bishop of Dunblane
William Chisholm (II) (died 1593), bishop of Dunblane and of Vaison, and nephew of William (I)
William Chisholm (Nova Scotia politician) (1870–1936), Canadian politician who represented Antigonish, Nova Scotia
William Chisholm (Upper Canada politician) (1788–1842), Upper Canada politician and the founder of Oakville, Ontario
William A. A. Chisholm, 1823 founder of the Woodville Republican newspaper in Woodville, Mississippi
Bill Chisholm (1909–1966), American Olympic athlete